National Cycle Network (NCN) Route 56 is a Sustrans National Route that runs from Chester to Liverpool. The route utilises country lanes, a former railway trackbed, a coastal path and a seaside promenade.

Route

Chester to Hooton
The route begins north of Chester Zoo at a junction with National Cycle Route 5. The route travels through Backford, Dunkirk, Capenhurst and Ledsham to the outskirts of Hooton.

Hooton to Parkgate
The route follows the former railway trackbed of the Wirral Way, in Wirral Country Park, through Willaston, where it passes the former Hadlow Road railway station, and Neston to Parkgate.

Parkgate to Leasowe

The route travels inland from Parkgate to Thornton Hough where it then travels along the centre of Wirral, northwards through Brimstage, Storeton, Landican, Woodchurch, Upton, Beechwood, Bidston and the outskirts of Leasowe where it meets the Irish Sea at the Gunsite.

Leasowe to Seacombe
The route follows the pathway along the North Wirral Coastal Park eastwards, from Leasowe, before entering New Brighton. The route then turns south along Egremont promenade before reaching Seacombe.

Liverpool

After travelling across the River Mersey, the route splits into two, around the centre of Liverpool, before joining with National Cycle Route 62 at Childwall.

See also 
 National Cycle Network
 Sustrans

References

External links

Sustrans NCN Route 56

Transport in Cheshire
Transport in Merseyside